The men's road race T1-2 cycling event at the 2016 Summer Paralympics took place on September 17 at Pontal, Rio. The race distance was 60 km.

Results : Men's road race T1-2

References

Men's road race T1-2